Cymindis alternans is a species of ground beetle in the subfamily Harpalinae. It was described by Rambur in 1837.

References

alternans
Beetles described in 1837